Mikhail Iosifovich Tumanishvili, born 19 June 1935, died 22 December 2010, was a Russian stage and film director and actor. Tumanishvili is best known of his 1980s action films Hit Back, Incident at Map Grid 36-80 and The Detached Mission, which is often referred as the  Soviet Rambo.

He was born in Moscow as the son of film director Josef Tumanishvili, who was also the chief of Moscow Operetta Theatre and the Bolshoi Theatre. Tumanishvili graduated from the actors faculty of Boris Shchukin Theatre Institute and the musical direction department of Russian Academy of Theatre Arts. He worked as a stage director in Pushkin Theatre and started making films in 1981. Tumanishvili was the head director of the opening and closing ceremonies of the 1980 Summer Olympics in Moscow.

Selected filmography

As director 
Hit Back (1981)
Incident at Map Grid 36-80 (1982)
Obstacle Сourse (1984)
The Detached Mission (1985)
Free Fall (1987)
Crash – Cop's Daughter (1989)Wolfhound (1991)Stalin's Testament (1993)Crusader (1995)

 As actor Leningrad Symphony (1957)Battle in the Way (1961)Life First (1961)Armageddon (1962)Crusader'' (1995)

References

External links

1935 births
2010 deaths
Russian people of Georgian descent
Soviet theatre directors
Soviet film directors
Soviet male film actors
Male actors from Moscow
Russian film directors
Russian Academy of Theatre Arts alumni